Frank Farrell "Fuzzy" Walton (November 15, 1912 – January 1973) was an American Negro league outfielder in the 1930s.

A native of Greensburg, Pennsylvania, Walton played for the Pittsburgh Crawfords in 1938. He died in Pittsburgh, Pennsylvania in 1973 at age 60.

References

External links
 and Seamheads

1912 births
1973 deaths
Pittsburgh Crawfords players
Baseball outfielders
Baseball players from Pennsylvania
People from Greensburg, Pennsylvania
20th-century African-American sportspeople